Benedetto del Balzo was a Roman Catholic prelate who served as Bishop of Alessano (1465–1488).

Biography
In 1465, Giovanni Giacomo del Balzo was appointed during the papacy of Pope Paul II as Bishop of Alessano.<
He served as Bishop of Alessano until his resignation in 1488.

References

External links and additional sources
 (for Chronology of Bishops) 
 (for Chronology of Bishops) 

15th-century Italian Roman Catholic bishops
Bishops appointed by Pope Paul II